Cylindromyia is a genus of flies in the family Tachinidae.

Species

Subgenus Apinocyptera Townsend, 1915
C. nana (Townsend, 1915)
C. platensis Guimarães, 1976
C. signatipennis (Wulp, 1892)
C. thompsoni Guimarães, 1976
Subgenus Calocyptera Herting, 1983
C. intermedia (Meigen, 1824)
Subgenus Conopisoma Speiser, 1910
C. rufipes (Meigen, 1824)
Subgenus Cylindromyia Meigen, 1803
C. aldrichi Cortés, 1944
C. alticola Aldrich, 1926
C. angustipennis Herting, 1983
C. anthracina Guimarães, 1976
C. apicalis Bigot, 1878
C. armata Aldrich, 1926
C. arnaudi Guimarães, 1976
C. atra (Röder, 1885)
C. bakeri Aldrich, 1926
C. bicolor (Olivier, 1812)
C. binotata (Bigot, 1878)
C. brasiliana Townsend, 1927
C. brassicaria (Fabricius, 1775)
C. brevicornis (Loew, 1844)
C. californica Bigot, 1878
C. carinata Townsend, 1927
C. decora Aldrich, 1926
C. dorsalis (Wiedemann, 1830)
C. euchenor (Walker, 1849)
C. fumipennis (Bigot, 1878)
C. minor (Roeder, 1885)
C. nigra (Bigot, 1885)
C. obscura (Bigot, 1885)
C. pilipes (Loew, 1844)
C. pirioni (Townsend, 1931)
C. porteri (Brethes, 1925)
C. propusilla Sabrosky & Arnaud, 1955
C. uniformis Aldrich, 1926
C. uruguayensis Guimarães, 1976
C. xylotina (Egger, 1860)
Subgenus Dupuisia Lehrer, 1973
C. crassa (Loew, 1845)
Subgenus Exogaster Rondani, 1856
C. rufifrons (Loew, 1844)
Subgenus Gerocyptera Townsend, 1916
C. petiolata (Townsend, 1927)
Subgenus Ichneumonops Townsend, 1908
C. mirabilis (Townsend, 1908)
Subgenus Malayocyptera Townsend, 1926
C. agnieszkae Kolomiets, 1977
C. pandulata (Matsumura, 1916)
C. umbripennis (Wulp, 1881)
Subgenus Neocyptera Townsend, 1916
C. arator Reinhard, 1956
C. auriceps (Meigen, 1838)
C. compressa Aldrich, 1926
C. hermonensis Kugler, 1974
C. interrupta (Meigen, 1824)
Subgenus Ocypterula Rondani, 1856
C. pusilla (Meigen, 1824)
Subgenus Plesiocyptera Brauer & von Bergenstamm, 1893
C. rubida (Loew, 1854)
Unplaced to Subgenus
C. aurora Herting, 1983
C. evibrissata (Townsend, 1927)
C. flavitibia Sun & Marshall, 1995
C. fuscipennis (Wiedemann, 1819)
C. gemma (Richter, 1972)
C. luciflua (Villeneuve, 1944)
C. orientalis (Townsend, 1927)
C. scapularis (Loew, 1845)
C. tibetensis Sun & Marshall, 1995

References

Phasiinae
Tachinidae genera
Taxa named by Johann Wilhelm Meigen